Lachlan Edwards (born 27 April 1992) is an Australian professional American football punter who is a free agent. He played college football at Sam Houston State University.

Early life
Edwards was born in Hastings, Victoria, and attended Mornington Secondary College. In his youth, he was a promising player of Australian rules football, winning selection for the Dandenong Stingrays in the TAC Cup (Victoria's under-18 competition). Edwards subsequently went on to the North Ballarat Football Club, who play in the Victorian Football League (VFL). He spent three years on North Ballarat's list, but was unsuccessful in his attempts to be drafted into the Australian Football League (AFL). Prior to emigrating to the United States, Edwards attended the University of Ballarat, where he represented the university in Australian rules football, rugby, cricket, and track and field. He was selected to the 2012 All-Australian University team.

College career

Sam Houston State University
Edwards was selected to the All-Southland Conference First-team and Sports Network FCS All-America third-team. Edwards led the NCAA with a 44.4 yard punting average.

Professional career

New York Jets
On 30 April 2016, Edwards was drafted by the New York Jets in the seventh round (235th overall) in the 2016 NFL Draft. As a rookie in 2016, Edwards appeared in 16 games making 75 punts with 3,236 total punting yards, 24 attempts inside the 20, one attempt blocked, 59 yards at the longest, six landed out of bounds, and four touchbacks. In Week 4, against the Jacksonville Jaguars, he completed his first professional pass attempt, which went for 31 yards to Marcus Williams. Overall, in the 2017 season, he had 94 punts for 4,378 net yards for a 46.57 average.

Buffalo Bills
Edwards signed with the Buffalo Bills on 19 August 2020, but was waived eight days later.

Los Angeles Chargers
On 2 December 2020, Edwards was signed to the Los Angeles Chargers' practice squad. He was released on 7 December. He re-signed to the practice squad on 12 December. He signed a reserve/future contract with the Chargers on 5 January 2021. He was waived on 16 August.

Detroit Lions
On September 25, 2021, Edwards was signed to the Detroit Lions practice squad, but was released two days later.

Carolina Panthers
On October 26, 2021, Edwards was signed to the Carolina Panthers practice squad. He was promoted to the active roster on November 8, 2021.

See also
List of players who have converted from one football code to another

References

External links

Sam Houston University bio

1992 births
Living people
American football punters
Australian players of American football
Australian rules footballers from Victoria (Australia)
Buffalo Bills players
Dandenong Stingrays players
Detroit Lions players
Los Angeles Chargers players
New York Jets players
Carolina Panthers players
North Ballarat Football Club players
Sam Houston Bearkats football players
Sportspeople from Melbourne
Australian rules football players that played in the NFL
People from Hastings, Victoria
Sportsmen from Victoria (Australia)